Gbewaa College of Education is a teacher education college in Pusiga-Bawku (Pusiga District / Bawku Municipal District, Upper East Region region, Ghana).
Pusiga District / Bawku Municipal District, Upper East Region, Ghana). Located in Northern Zone, the school was set up in 1953 and affiliated to the University of  Ghana. It is one of the 46 public colleges of education in Ghana.

The college participated in the DFID-funded T-TEL programme. For  the 2016–2017 academic year, the school  admitted 560 students into Diploma in Education course.

History 
Government Training College Pusiga which is now Gbewaa College of Education was established in 1953. It was built on a land that only became part of Ghana after the 1956 plebiscite. Until then, that part of Ghana was called Trans-Volta Togoland.

In September 1953, the College admitted 14 male students, to start the Certificate ‘B’ course. They were handled by 7 male tutors including the Principal. It remained a male Institution until 1976, when it became a mixed college.

The College has produced good sportsmen and women. Gbewaa College of Education won a prize from World Education/USAID for embarking on a successful Anti HIV/Aids Campaign in 2006.

Programmes 
The programmes of the College since its establishment include:

 Certificate ‘B’ Post Middle 1954 - 1964
 Certificate ‘A’ Post Middle 1964 - 1991
 Cert ‘A’ Three Year Post Secondary 1992 - 2004
 Diploma in Basic Education 2004 -
 Distance Education Programme in Basic Education for Untrained Teachers 2005 - 2009 for the award of:

i. Diploma in Basic Education

ii. Certificate ‘A’ four - year

Notable alumni 
The College has produced academic giants for the nation. Some of them are:

Prof. Nabilla, member of Council of State
Dr. Kwabena Adjei, N.D.C. National Chairman
Dr. Abdulai, Principal Tamale Polytechnic
Dr. Golfred Tangu, Minister of State in charge of Roads
Dr. Dominic Donile, NCCE, Accra
Prof. Saaka
Hon. Awudu Yirimenya, Dep. Minister of Local Government
Mr. B.L. Baba, LOC, Accra
Sharlotte Azorago, 2004 National Best Teacher.

References 

Colleges of Education in Ghana
Educational institutions established in 1953
1953 establishments in Gold Coast (British colony)
Upper East Region